An east wind is a wind that originates in the east and blows west.

East wind or Eastwind may also refer to:

Music
 Eastwind (music festival)
 EastWind, a 1992 album of Bulgarian and Macedonian folk music by Andy Irvine and Davy Spillane
 East Wind (musical), a musical comedy by Sigmund Romberg, Oscar Hammerstein II and Frank Mandel, premiered on Broadway in 1931; See Starlight Theatre (Kansas City, Missouri)
 East Wind Records, a Japanese jazz record label that was established in 1974

Transportation
 Eastwind Airlines
 USCGC Eastwind (WAGB-279), an icebreaker
 USS Eastwind (IX-234), a racing yacht
 East Wind (train), a mid-20th century summer passenger train of the northeastern United States

Other uses
 East Wind Community, an intentional community in Missouri, US

See also
 Dongfeng Motor (Dongfeng means: "East wind")
 Asia Plus (Literal translation from the Chinese name is: "East Wind Satellite TV")
 East Wind: West Wind, a 1930 novel by Pearl S. Buck
 Dongfeng (disambiguation)